Mahesh Kisanrao Landge, colloquially as, Mahesh Dada (brother) (born 27 November 1975) is an Indian politician who is currently a Member of the Maharashtra Legislative Assembly from Bhosari Vidhan sabha constituency in the Pune district. He is Member of the Bharatiya Janata Party and current city president of Bharatiya Janata Party of Pimpri-Chinchwad.

Political career 
Before entering into politics Landge was a well-known wrestler. Previously he was a corporator in PCMC.

Landge started his political career with Nationalist Congress Party and joined Bharatiya Janata Party in 2017.

Positions held 
Maharashtra Legislative Assembly from the Bhosari.

References 

Politicians from Pune
Bharatiya Janata Party politicians from Maharashtra
Members of the Maharashtra Legislative Assembly
Living people
Marathi politicians
21st-century Indian politicians
1975 births
Nationalist Congress Party politicians from Maharashtra